The Last Tree is the second album by Larkin Grimm, released in 2006.

Track listing
"The Last Tree" – 5:10
"Into the Grey Forest, Breathing Love" – 2:11
"I Killed Someone (Part 2)" – 4:54
"There is a Giant Panther" – 1:43
"Little Weeper" – 10:17
"The Most Excruciating Vibe" – 6:53
"No Moonlight" – 3:04
"Strange Creature" – 5:26
"The Sun Comes Up" – 1:55
"Link In Your Chain" – 3:59
"Rocky Top" – 3:19
"The Waterfall" – 2:29

References

2006 albums
Larkin Grimm albums